Zabrus inflatus is a species of ground beetle in the Iberozabrus subgenus that can be found in France and Spain.

References

Beetles described in 1828
Beetles of Europe